"Why Why Why" is a song by European-American pop group The Kelly Family. It was produced by Hartmut Pfannmüller and Kathy Kelly for their eighth regular studio album Over the Hump (1994) and features lead vocals by Joey and Paddy Kelly. Released as the album's second single, the song reached the top twenty of the Austrian Singles Chart. This song was also released as a promotional single in Italy after the band played it at the 1995 Festival di Sanremo as guest stars.

Track listings

Credits and personnel 
Credits adapted from the liner notes of Over the Hump.

Songwriting – The Kelly Family
Production – Hartmut Pfannmüller, Kathy Kelly
Executive production – Dan Kelly, Mike Ungefehr
Engineering – Günther Kasper

Charts

References

External links
 KellyFamily.de — official site

1995 songs
The Kelly Family songs